Celeste Troche (pronounced "say-LESS-tay TROH-shay") (born 13 February 1981) is a Paraguayan professional golfer.

Troche was born in Asunción. She attended Auburn University in the United States, and was a two time All-American. She was the co-medalist at the 2001 U.S. Women's Amateur.

Troche turned professional in 2003 and has played on the LPGA Tour since then, but has struggled to hold on to full LPGA Tour status so she has had to spend time on the Futures Tour. In 2007, Troche and her Paraguay team partner Julieta Granada won the Women's World Cup of Golf.

She graduated from Springwood School and returned to teach Spanish in later years.

Other achievements
 2000 Southeastern Conference (SEC) Freshman of the Year
 2001 SEC-ACC Shootout winner
 2001 Trans-National Championship winner
 2001 SEC Player of the Year
 2007 Women's World Cup of Golf winner (with Julieta Granada)

Team appearances
Amateur
Espirito Santo Trophy (representing Paraguay): 1998

Professional
World Cup (representing Paraguay): 2007 (winners), 2008

External links

Paraguayan female golfers
Auburn Tigers women's golfers
LPGA Tour golfers
Paraguayan expatriates in the United States
Sportspeople from Asunción
1981 births
Living people